Steve Geffrard (born August 28, 1990) is an American professional boxer.

Amateur career
Geffrard was the US amateur triple crown in 2010, winning the Police Athletic League title, the US Golden Gloves heavyweight title, and the US national amateur heavyweight title.

Professional career
On January 15, 2022, Geffrard was scheduled to fight Joe Smith Jr. for the WBO light heavyweight title; Geffrard took the fight on 8 days notice replacing Callum Johnson who tested positive for COVID-19.  Geffrard lost the fight, being stopped in the 9th round.

References

External links

Living people
American male boxers
Year of birth missing (living people)